Dimorphomyces is a genus of fungi in the family Laboulbeniaceae. The genus contain 27 species.

References

External links
Dimorphomyces at Index Fungorum

Laboulbeniomycetes